Steve Franks is an American screenwriter, director and musician based in Orange County, California.  He is best known as the creator of the USA Network original series Psych.

Education
Franks graduated from the University of California, Irvine in 1991 with a Bachelor of Arts degree in English. He also attended a graduate program at Loyola Marymount University.

Career
He devised the story for the 1999 comedy Big Daddy and wrote the screenplay with Tim Herlihy and Adam Sandler. It went on to be the seventh highest-grossing film of 1999, and was Sandler's highest-grosser domestically until Hotel Transylvania 2 (2015).

Franks created Psych, about a young crime consultant for the Santa Barbara Police Department whose "heightened observational skills" and impressive eidetic memory allow him to convince people that he solves cases with psychic abilities. Psych debuted on Friday, July 7, 2006. He also created the band The Friendly Indians, which recorded the show's theme song. He wrote several episodes of the series, and also directed many. Franks co-wrote and directed Psych: The Movie, a two-hour USA Network TV movie, which aired on December 7, 2017. On February 14, 2019, it was announced Psych: The Movie 2 was greenlit and all the main cast would return for the TV movie.

Franks also served as an executive producer and the showrunner on the CBS series Rush Hour, which was cancelled in May 2016.

Filmography (Psych)
 The extended "Pilot"
 "Spellingg Bee"
 "Speak Now or Forever Hold Your Piece"
 "Woman Seeking Dead Husband — Smokers Okay, No Pets"
 "From the Earth to the Starbucks"
 "Scary Sherry: Bianca's Toast" (with James Roday Rodriguez)
 "American Duos" (with Rodriguez)
 "65 Million Years Off"
 "Black and Tan: A Crime of Fashion" (with Rodriguez)
 "Shawn (and Gus) of the Dead" (Franks also directed)
 "Ghosts"
 "Six Feet Under the Sea" (Franks also directed)
 "Tuesday the 17th" (with Rodriguez)
 "Extradition: British Columbia" (Franks also directed)
 "Bollywood Homicide" (with Anupam Nigam)
 "A Very Juliet Episode" (with Tim Meltreger; Franks also directed)
 "Think Tank" (with Andy Berman)
 "The Head, the Tail, the Whole Damn Episode" (with Meltreger)
 "Romeo and Juliet and Juliet" (Franks also directed)
 "Extradition II: The Actual Extradition Part" (Franks also directed)
 "In Plain Fright" (with Meltreger)
 "Shawn Rescues Darth Vader" (Franks also directed)
 "Indiana Shawn and the Temple of the Kinda Crappy, Rusty Old Dagger" (Franks also directed)
 "Santabarbaratown 2" (with Bill Callahan)
 "Psych: The Musical" (Franks also directed)
 "Lock, Stock, Some Smoking Barrels and Burton Guster's Goblet of Fire" (with Kell Cahoon; Franks also directed)
 "The Break-Up" (Franks also directed)

References

External links
 
 Steve Franks bio at the USA Network

American male screenwriters
American television directors
Television producers from California
American television writers
Living people
University of California, Irvine alumni
Place of birth missing (living people)
Year of birth missing (living people)
Loyola Marymount University alumni
American male television writers
Screenwriters from California
Psych
20th-century American screenwriters
21st-century American screenwriters
20th-century American male writers
21st-century American male writers